Jason Hanson (born June 17, 1970) is an American former professional football player who was a kicker who spent his entire 21-year career with the Detroit Lions of the National Football League (NFL). After playing college football with the Washington State Cougars, he was selected by the Lions in the second round  of the 1992 NFL Draft with the 56th overall pick. Hanson holds the NFL record for the most seasons played with one team and also holds multiple kicking and scoring records. Due to his longevity and statistical success, even on many non-playoff teams, Hanson is often cited as one of the most-loved players in Detroit Lions franchise history.

High school career
Born in Spokane, Washington, Hanson graduated from Mead High School in 1988, where he lettered in football, basketball, and soccer.  As a senior, Hanson won All-Greater Spokane League honors as both a kicker and punter and was named a first-team All-State honoree by the Washington Sportswriters Association. In the classroom at Mead, he maintained a perfect 4.0 grade point average.

College career
Hanson attended Washington State University in Pullman, where he walked-on as a freshman in 1988 and made an immediate impact with the Cougars; he was named to The Sporting News Freshman All-America team.  Hanson set or tied many NCAA records, and his percentage of 57.1 for field goals from 50 yards or greater remains a Pac-12 Conference record. He holds the record for most field goals from 50 yards or more (20), and 40 yards or more (39).  Hanson's school records include most points scored (328), longest field goal (62 yards), most games with two or more field goals (20), field goals (63), and PATs (139). He was also the punter at WSU during his final two seasons, and was a teammate of quarterback Drew Bledsoe, who arrived in 1990. Hanson earned a Bachelor of Science degree from WSU in pre-med studies, with 3.78 grade point average. Hanson was inducted into the College Football Hall of Fame in 2020.

Professional career

Hanson was selected in the second round of the 1992 NFL Draft by the Lions, the 56th overall pick. He retired from the Lions in 2013; no NFL player played as many games (327) with the same team as Hanson, breaking the old record of 296 held by Bruce Matthews in Week 2 of the 2011 season vs. the Kansas City Chiefs. At the beginning of the 2012 season, he set the record for most years with the same club with 21 seasons.

On December 14, 2008, against the Indianapolis Colts, Hanson passed Morten Andersen for most 50+ yard field goals in NFL history. Hanson again had a good year, ending the 2008 NFL season 21-for-22 on field goal attempts (including 8 for 8 from 50+ yards) and 25-for-26 on extra point attempts. Statistically, this was the second best season of Hanson's career with respect to field goal attempts; he missed only one. After the late 2010 NFL season, Hanson had missed only eight extra points in his career, five of which were blocked.

On December 2, 2010, the Lions placed him on injured reserve due to an injured right knee.

Hanson was named NFC Special Teams Player of the Month for September 2011 after kicking a perfect 8 of 8 field goals. It was his fifth-career Special Teams Player of the Month award and his first since November 2003.

Hanson is the team's all-time leader in scoring, with 2,150 points, and in field goals with 495, and holds a variety of other team records for kicking and scoring. He represented the NFC in the Pro Bowl in 1998 and 1999, and was an alternate in 1997 and 2008. He has booted 17 game-winning field goals in his career; eight in regulation and nine in overtime.

On April 4, 2013, Hanson announced his retirement. At the time of his retirement, he was the oldest active player in the NFL, the last player to have played for the same team he played for prior to the advent of free agency, and the last active player to play at Milwaukee County Stadium.

Hanson was named the 2002 recipient of the Detroit Lions/Detroit Sports Broadcasters Association/Pro Football Writers Association's (PFWA) Media-Friendly "Good Guy" Award. The Good Guy Award is given yearly to the Detroit Lions player who shows consideration to, and cooperation with the media at all times during the course of the season. Hanson was also named Offensive Rookie Of The Year by the PFWA in 1992. As of 2022, he remains the only NFL kicker ever awarded that distinction.

The Detroit Lions inducted him into the Ring of Honor in fall 2013 at Ford Field for his success and dedication to Detroit Lions football.

Career regular season statistics
Career high/best bolded

NFL records
 Most field goals of 40 or more yards (career) – 189
 Most consecutive field goals of 40 or more yards – 24 (2007–09)
 Became the second player in league history (after Jason Elam) to score 200+ points against three teams (division rivals Chicago, Green Bay, and Minnesota).
 Most career games with one NFL team – 327 (1992-2012).
 Most career seasons with one NFL team – 21 (1992-2012).
 Most career points with one NFL team – 2,150 
 Became the first player in NFL history to score 2,000 points with one franchise.
 Most career game winning field goals in overtime – nine (tied with Jason Elam, Jim Breech, and Steve Christie)

Personal life
Hanson and his wife, Kathleen, were married in 1992 and have three children. His younger brother Travis was a kicker for the rival University of Washington Huskies, and was a member of the 1991 national championship team. Hanson is a Christian.

References

External links
 Washington State University Athletic Hall-of-Fame  – Jason Hanson – inducted 2001
 

1970 births
Living people
All-American college football players
American football placekickers
College Football Hall of Fame inductees
Detroit Lions players
National Conference Pro Bowl players
Players of American football from Spokane, Washington
Washington State Cougars football players
Washington State University alumni
Ed Block Courage Award recipients